Carlo Leoni may refer to:
Carlo Leoni (historian) (1812–1872), Italian historian and epigraphist
Carlo Leoni (politician) (born 1955), Italian politician